Edward G. Staback (July 2, 1937 – November 19, 2022) was an American politician who served as a Democratic member of the Pennsylvania House of Representatives, representing the 115th District from 1985 to 2012. A  Democrat, Staback also served on the Lackawanna County Board of Commissioners in 2015.

Early life and education
Staback was born on July 2, 1937 in Olyphant, Pennsylvania, the son of Irene (née Zipay) and Adolph Staback. He graduated from Saint Patrick's High School in 1955 and earned a Bachelor of Arts degree in business economics from King's College in 1959.

Political career
Staback was first elected to represent the 115th District in the Pennsylvania House of Representatives in 1984. He served a total of fourteen terms in the House before retiring in 2012. 

In 2015, Staback was chosen to fill a vacancy on the Lackawanna County Board of Commissioners left by the resignation of Corey O'Brien. He was sworn-in on March 13, 2015. He chose not to seek re-election in November and his term expired in January 2016.

Personal life and death
Staback died on November 19, 2022, at the age of 85, while on a hunting trip, in Nebraska, with his son.

References

External links
Pennsylvania House of Representatives - Edward Staback (Democrat) official PA House website
Pennsylvania House Democratic Caucus - Edward Staback official Party website

1937 births
2022 deaths
21st-century American politicians
Democratic Party members of the Pennsylvania House of Representatives
People from Olyphant, Pennsylvania

Lackawanna County Commissioners (Pennsylvania)